In mathematics, the Wright omega function or Wright function, denoted ω, is defined in terms of the Lambert W function as:

Uses
One of the main applications of this function is in the resolution of the equation z = ln(z), as the only solution is given by z = e−ω(π i).

y = ω(z) is the unique solution, when  for x ≤ −1, of the equation y + ln(y) = z. Except on those two rays, the Wright omega function is continuous, even analytic.

Properties
The Wright omega function satisfies the relation .

It also satisfies the differential equation

 

wherever ω is analytic (as can be seen by performing separation of variables and recovering the equation ), and as a consequence its integral can be expressed as:

 

Its Taylor series around the point  takes the form :

 

where

 

in which

 

is a second-order Eulerian number.

Values

Plots

Notes

References
 "On the Wright ω function", Robert Corless and David Jeffrey

Special functions

The link to this sole reference is broken. The apparent original link source seems to be: https://orcca.on.ca/TechReports/ but that sights link to the pdf: https://orcca.on.ca/TechReports/2000/TR-00-12.html is also broken. Viable referencing is needed.